Versatile Video Coding (VVC), also known as H.266, ISO/IEC 23090-3, and MPEG-I Part 3, is a video compression standard finalized on 6 July 2020, by the Joint Video Experts Team (JVET), a joint video expert team of the VCEG working group of ITU-T Study Group 16 and the MPEG working group of ISO/IEC JTC 1/SC 29. It is the successor to High Efficiency Video Coding (HEVC, also known as ITU-T H.265 and MPEG-H Part 2). It was developed with two primary goals improved compression performance and support for a very broad range of applications.

Concept 
In October 2015, the MPEG and VCEG formed the Joint Video Exploration Team (JVET) to evaluate available compression technologies and study the requirements for a next-generation video compression standard. The new standard has about 50% better compression rate for the same perceptual quality, with support for lossless and subjectively lossless compression. It supports resolutions ranging from very low resolution up to 4K and 16K as well as 360° videos. VVC supports YCbCr 4:4:4, 4:2:2 and 4:2:0 with 8–10 bits per component, BT.2100 wide color gamut and high dynamic range (HDR) of more than 16 stops (with peak brightness of 1000, 4000 and 10000 nits), auxiliary channels (for depth, transparency, etc.), variable and fractional frame rates from 0 to 120 Hz and higher, scalable video coding for temporal (frame rate), spatial (resolution), SNR, color gamut and dynamic range differences, stereo/multiview coding, panoramic formats, and still-picture coding. Work on high bit depth support (12 to 16 bits per component) started in October 2020 and was included in the second edition published in 2022. Encoding complexity of several times (up to ten times) that of HEVC is expected, depending on the quality of the encoding algorithm (which is outside the scope of the standard). The decoding complexity is about twice that of HEVC.

VVC development has been made using the VVC Test Model (VTM), a reference software codebase that was started with a minimal set of coding tools. Further coding tools have been added after being tested in Core Experiments (CEs). Its predecessor was the Joint Exploration Model (JEM), an experimental software codebase that was based on the reference software used for HEVC.

History 
JVET issued a final Call for Proposals in October 2017, and the standardization process officially began in April 2018 when the first working draft of the standard was produced.

At IBC 2018, a preliminary implementation based on VVC was demonstrated that was said to compress video 40% more efficiently than HEVC.

The content of the final standard was approved on 6 July 2020.

Schedule 

 October 2017: Call for Proposals
 April 2018: Evaluation of the proposals received and first draft of the standard
 July 2019: Ballot issued for Committee Draft
 October 2019: Ballot issued for Draft International Standard
 6 July 2020: Completion of final standard

Licensing 
To reduce the risk of the problems seen when licensing HEVC implementations, for VVC a new group called the Media Coding Industry Forum (MC-IF) was founded. However, MC-IF had no power over the standardization process, which was based on technical merit as determined by consensus decisions of JVET.

Four companies were initially vying to be patent pool administrators for VVC, in a situation similar to the previous AVC and HEVC codecs. Two companies were later reported to be forming pools: Access Advance and MPEG LA.

Access Advance has already published the amount of the required license fee.

Adoption

Software 
Encoders/decoders
 Fraunhofer HHI released a source-available VVC encoder called VVenC and decoder called VVdeCFraunhofer Versatile Video Encoder (VVenC)
VVC VTM reference software
 Tencent Media Lab supports VVC in a real time decoder and the Tencent Cloud service supports it with transcoding and streaming in its cloud infrastructure.
 uvg266 open source encoder
 x266 encoder to be publicly released in H2 2023
Players
Spin Digital sells a real time VVC decoder and player for Linux and Windows devices.
 In 2021 MX Player was reported to deliver content in VVC to up to 20% of its mobile customers.

Hardware

Broadcast 
The Brazilian SBTVD Forum selected VVC for Brazil's upcoming TV 3.0.
The Brazilian SBTVD Forum will adopt the MPEG-I VVC codec in its forthcoming broadcast television system, TV 3.0, expected to launch in 2024.
It will be used alongside MPEG-5 LC EVC as a video base layer encoder for broadcast and broadband delivery.

The European organization DVB Project, which governs digital television broadcasting standards, announced 24 February 2022 that VVC was now part of its tools for broadcasting.
The DVB tuner specification used throughout Europe, Australia, and many other regions has been revised to support the VVC (H.266) video codec, the successor to HEVC.

See also 
 H.262 / MPEG-2 Part 2 video
 H.264 / MPEG-4 Part 10: Advanced Video Coding / AVC
 H.265 / MPEG-H Part 2: High Efficiency Video Coding / HEVC
 AOMedia Video 1 (AV1)
 MPEG-5 Part 1: Essential Video Coding / EVC
 Layered coding other name - scalable coding:
 
 Scalable Video Coding - Layered (that is scalable) coding for H264
 
 MPEG-5 Part 2: Low Complexcity Enhancement Video Coding / LC EVC

External links 
 VVC website at the Fraunhofer Heinrich Hertz Institute with source code of: VTM or VVdeC or VVenC
 Stand by for ITU H.266 compression
 MPEG - Versatile Video Coding
 Finalisation of VVC

Notes

References

H.26x
MPEG
Open standards covered by patents
Video codecs
Video compression